Martha Palafox Gutiérrez (23 February 1949 – 17 March 2022) was a Mexican politician affiliated with the Labor Party. She served as Senator of the LXII Legislature of the Mexican Congress representing Tlaxcala. She also served as deputy of the Chamber of Deputies during the LVII and LIX Legislatures.

References

1949 births
2022 deaths
Politicians from Tlaxcala
Morena (political party) politicians
Labor Party (Mexico) politicians
Women members of the Senate of the Republic (Mexico)
Members of the Chamber of Deputies (Mexico) for Tlaxcala
Members of the Senate of the Republic (Mexico) for Tlaxcala
Deputies of the LVII Legislature of Mexico
Deputies of the LXII Legislature of Mexico
Senators of the LXII and LXIII Legislatures of Mexico
21st-century Mexican politicians
21st-century Mexican women politicians
Women members of the Chamber of Deputies (Mexico)
Autonomous University of Tlaxcala alumni